John Michael Jack,  (born 17 September 1946) is a Conservative Party politician in the United Kingdom and was Member of Parliament for Fylde between 1987 and 2010, serving at various junior ministerial posts during the John Major administration.

Early life

Michael Jack was born in Folkestone, Kent, England, the son of Ralph and Florence Jack. He attended Bradford Grammar School and then Bradford Institute of Technology (now the University of Bradford). At the University of Leicester, he received a BA in Economics, and a MPhil in Transport Economics. He worked for Procter & Gamble from 1971 to 1975. From 1975 to 1980 he worked at Marks & Spencer, being PA to Managing Director Lord Rayner from 1975 to 1976, National Chairman of the Young Conservatives from 1976 to 1977, Sales Director at LO Jeffs Ltd (a fresh produce supply company and part of Northern Foods) from 1981 to 1987. He has also been a member of the Eastern Area Electricity Consultative Council, and of the Mersey Regional Health Authority.

Parliamentary career

He contested Newcastle Central in February 1974. He was a Minister at the DSS from 1990 to 1992, at the Home Office from 1992 to 1993, then at MAFF from 1993 to 1995. From 1995 to 1997, he was Financial Secretary to the Treasury. William Hague appointed him a member of his Shadow Cabinet in 1997 as Shadow Agriculture Minister, but he returned to the back-benches in 1998. He was Chairman of the Environment, Food and Rural Affairs Committee. He was a pro-European, and was member of the Tory Reform Group.

He was appointed to the Privy Council in the 1997 New Year Honours. On 14 March 2008, Jack announced that he would stand down at the 2010 general election. After he left Parliament he served as chairman of the Office of Tax Simplification and he was appointed Commander of the Order of the British Empire (CBE) in the 2015 New Year Honours for services to tax policy.

Personal life
He married Alison Jane Musgrave in 1976, and they have two sons.

He retired as Chairman of Topps Tiles Plc in 2015, having served since 1999.

In 2018 he was appointed Chair of Governors of the Royal Agricultural University.

References

External links

ePolitix.com – Michael Jack MP
Guardian Unlimited Politics – Ask Aristotle: Michael Jack MP
TheyWorkForYou.com – Michael Jack MP
The Public Whip – Michael Jack MP voting record
BBC News – Michael Jack MP profile 4 March 2005

Audio clips
Discussing a £40m fridge mountain in 2002
Discussing Margaret Beckett in 2007

News items
Discussing Gangmasters in 2004

1946 births
Alumni of the University of Leicester
Commanders of the Order of the British Empire
Conservative Party (UK) MPs for English constituencies
Living people
Members of the Privy Council of the United Kingdom
People educated at Bradford Grammar School
UK MPs 1987–1992
UK MPs 1992–1997
UK MPs 1997–2001
UK MPs 2001–2005
UK MPs 2005–2010